Daúde Candeal or simply Daúde, is the stage name of Maria Waldelurdes Costa de Santana Dutilleux, a Brazilian musician, singer-songwriter, and scholar. She was born September 23, 1961, in Salvador, Brazil.  At age 11, she moved to Rio de Janeiro, where she studied Voice under Paulo Fortes at the Instituto Villa-Lobos and Theatre at the Escola de Teatro Martins Penna. She later earned a Bachelor's in Portuguese Literature, and a post-graduate degree in African History.

Daúde began her musical career singing in plays and nightclubs. She recorded her first CD, Daúde, in 1995. She received critical acclaim, winning the Prêmio Sharp from the APCA (São Paulo Association of Art Critics) and the Jornal do Brasil Readers' Award.

Two years later, she released Daúde #2, produced by Celso Fonseca and Will Mowat. 

In 1999, she released Simbora, including dance remixes of earlier songs. The production fuses authentic Daúde, MPB, and electronic music, thus highlighting the importance of DJs and producers as creative partners.

Daúde was the first Brazilian signed by Peter Gabriel's Real World Records. Her 2003 album Neguinha, Te Amo honored women as it transcended stereotypes of Brazilian music, helping increase international attention to Brazilian music.

In 2014, Daúde released her fifth album, Código Daúde, featuring high-energy covers of Brazilian standards.

Discography 
 1995 — Daúde, Natasha Records (CD)
 1997 — Daúde #2, Natasha Records (CD)
 1999 — Simbora, Natasha Records (CD)
 2003 — Neguinha, Te Amo, Real World Records (CD)
 2015 — Código Daúde, Lab 344 (CD)

References

External links
Official Site (In Portuguese)
Daúde Real World Records bio

1961 births
Living people
20th-century Brazilian women singers
20th-century Brazilian singers
Brazilian women singer-songwriters
21st-century Brazilian women singers
21st-century Brazilian singers